Redley A. Killion (born 23 October 1951) is a Micronesian politician and public servant, who served two consecutive terms as the sixth Vice President of the Federated States of Micronesia from May 1999 to May 2007.

Early life and education
Killion is from Chuuk State. He holds a Bachelor of Arts degree in economics from the University of Hawaii at Manoa and a Master of Arts degree in economics from Vanderbilt University.

Career
Killion began his career in 1974 working at the Department of Resources and Development, and served as the first director of Department of Resources and Development, Chuuk State, from 1979 to 1986.

In 1987, he was elected as a senator to the 5th Congress of the Federated States of Micronesia, and served in congress until he was elected Vice President of the Federated States of Micronesia in 1999.

Personal life
Killion has nine children.

References

Official biography
Biography

1951 births
Living people
University of Hawaiʻi at Mānoa alumni
Vanderbilt University alumni
Members of the Congress of the Federated States of Micronesia
People from Chuuk State
Vice presidents of the Federated States of Micronesia